The following highways are numbered 974:

United States